Rockglen Airport  is located  south-east of Rockglen, Saskatchewan, Canada.

See also 
 List of airports in Saskatchewan

References 

Registered aerodromes in Saskatchewan
Poplar Valley No. 12, Saskatchewan